Frontier is a Canadian historical drama television series co-created by Rob Blackie and Peter Blackie, chronicling the North American fur trade in colonial Canada/Rupert's Land, sometime in the late 1700s or early 1800s. The series is co-produced by Discovery Canada, as the channel's first original scripted commission, and Netflix. The series premiered on November 6, 2016.

The series was renewed for a second season in October 2016, ahead of its premiere, which premiered on October 18, 2017. Frontier was renewed for a third season on September 20, 2017, also ahead of the previous second season. The entirety of the third season premiered first on Netflix on November 23, 2018, and was broadcast in Canada between December 7 and 21, 2018.

Synopsis 
The series chronicles the North American fur trade in late 1700s Canada, and follows Declan Harp (Jason Momoa), a half-Irish, half-Cree outlaw who is campaigning to breach the Hudson's Bay Company's monopoly on the fur trade in Canada, which has become corrupt and engages in illegal activities to enrich itself.

Cast

Main

Recurring 
 Sean Wei Mah as Omaciw
 Graham Abbey as MacLaughlan (season 1)
 A.C. Peterson as Governor Threadwell (season 1)
 Peter O'Meara as Peter Carruthers (season 1)
 Nathaniel Arcand as Wahush (season 2)
 Star Slade as Minno (season 2)
 Ryan Tarran as Wadlow (season 3)

Episodes

Series overview

Season 1 (2016)

Season 2 (2017)

Season 3 (2018)

Production  
The series is co-produced by Discovery Canada, as the channel's first original scripted commission, and Netflix. Filming for Frontier took place in several locations in Newfoundland and Labrador, Nova Scotia, and Ontario, Canada, as well as Cornwall and Northumberland in the United Kingdom.

Release 
The series is produced in 4K ultra high definition; on January 8, 2016, Bell Media confirmed that Frontier would stream in 4K via the Discovery Go app exclusively on Samsung 4K smart TVs.

The series premiered on November 6, 2016. The series was renewed for a second season in October 2016, ahead of its premiere, which premiered on October 18, 2017. Frontier was renewed for a third season on September 20, 2017, also ahead of the previous season. The entirety of the third season premiered first on Netflix on November 23, 2018, and was broadcast in Canada between December 7 and 21, 2018.

Internationally, the series is distributed by Netflix, with the first season available from January 20, 2017. An exclusivity agreement meant that the series would not be available on Netflix in Canada until 2017.

Reception 
The first season received mixed reviews. On Rotten Tomatoes it has an approval rating from critics of 43% based on 14 reviews, with the site's consensus reading "Jason Momoa's powerhouse performance as Declan Harp is ultimately weighed down by Frontier often sluggish storytelling". Metacritic gave the series a weighted average score of 52 out of 100, based on reviews from 11 critics, indicating "mixed or average reviews".

In a positive review, John Doyle of The Globe and Mail described the series as "an action-packed, uncomplicated and very entertaining yarn about the cutthroats who created this country by plundering it, when they weren't busy killing each other". Doyle felt the opening episode's handling of interactions with First Nations was handled "delicately," commenting that Frontier was "far from being a whitewashed tale about the English, Scots, Irish and French battling out for possession of fur and land".

The second season was better received and has a 100% critic rating on Rotten Tomatoes based on 5 reviews.

Awards and  nominations

Canadian Screen Awards

Directors Guild of Canada Awards

References

External links 
 
 Frontier Watch Frontier | Netflix Official Site on Netflix
 

2010s Canadian drama television series
2016 Canadian television series debuts
2018 Canadian television series endings
Canadian Western (genre) television series
Discovery Channel (Canada) original programming
English-language Netflix original programming
Historical television series
Television shows about Native Americans
2010s Western (genre) television series